CityMall Arnaldo-Roxas is a shopping mall located at Arnaldo Blvd, Roxas, Capiz. It is the first mall under the CityMall brand in the Philippines which is developed and owned by DoubleDragon Properties. It was completed on December 15, 2014 and was opened March 27, 2015. The mall is part of the CityMall Arnaldo-Roxas complex and is the first of the two CityMalls in Roxas City.

Overview
It is equipped with solar panels and a rain collection system.

References

Shopping malls in the Philippines
Buildings and structures in Roxas, Capiz
Shopping malls established in 2015
Tourist attractions in Capiz